The 1931 Belgian Grand Prix was a Grand Prix motor race held at Spa-Francorchamps on 12 July 1931.

Classification

Race

Starting grid positions

Notes

References

Belgian Grand Prix
Belgian Grand Prix
Grand Prix, 1931